Juan Luis Sanfuentes Andonaegui (27 December 1858 – 16 July 1930) was President of Chile between 1915 and 1920.

Sanfuentes was the son of writer and politician Salvador Sanfuentes Torres and Matilde Andonaegui.  Orphaned at an early age and raised by his older brother, Enrique Salvador Sanfuentes, he trained as a lawyer at the University of Chile.  He graduated with a Doctor of Law in 1879.  He married Ana Echazarreta (ca. 1865–1927) in 1885, and the couple had five children.

Rising to the position of Minister of Finance under Federico Errázuriz Echaurren in 1901, Sanfuentes served as President of the Senate of Chile from 1906 through 1909.

The Chilean presidential election of 1915 developed into a bitter contest between Sanfuentes —a coalition candidate of the Liberal Democratic Party and the Conservative Party— and Javier Ángel Figueroa —supported by the Liberal Alliance parties. Sanfuentes beat Figueroa by a single vote, among allegations of fraud and electoral intervention.  The National Congress was called to confirm the result.

Through World War I Chile remained neutral.  While the conflict lasted, domestic industry had one of its biggest booms, with the national industry growing 53% in those four years.  But the end of the war led to a crisis of the nitrate industry, which resulted in a wave of social unrest.

Sanfuentes' hard line against striking coal miners and trade unionists in the final year of his presidency was a key factor in the rise of his liberal reformer successor.

After office, Sanfuentes retired from public life, devoting himself to family life with his wife in his estate, Camarico, near Talca.

Honours and awards

Foreign Honours 
:
  Grand Cross of the Order of the Tower and Sword (22 April 1921)
:
  Grand Cross of the Order of Charles III (19 June 1922)

References 

1858 births
1930 deaths
People from Santiago
Chilean people of Basque descent
Liberal Democratic Party (Chile, 1893) politicians
Presidents of Chile
Government ministers of Chile
Deputies of the XXII Legislative Period of the National Congress of Chile
Deputies of the Constituent Congress of Chile (1891)
Senators of the XXVI Legislative Period of the National Congress of Chile
Senators of the XXVII Legislative Period of the National Congress of Chile
Senators of the XXVIII Legislative Period of the National Congress of Chile
Senators of the XXIX Legislative Period of the National Congress of Chile
Senators of the XXX Legislative Period of the National Congress of Chile
Senators of the XXXI Legislative Period of the National Congress of Chile
Candidates for President of Chile
Instituto Nacional General José Miguel Carrera alumni
University of Chile alumni
People of the Chilean Civil War of 1891 (Balmacedistas)